Bernardino Caldaioli (6 December 1847 – 27 February 1907) was a Roman Catholic prelate who served as Bishop of Grosseto (1884–1907).

Biography
Bernardino Caldaioli was born in Castel del Piano, in Mount Amiata, located east-northeast of Grosseto. He was named titular bishop of Magydus (Turkey) and coadjutor bishop of Grosseto on 9 August 1883 by Pope Leo XIII. He succeeded to the bishopric on the death of bishop Giovanni Battista Bagalà Blasini on 1 March 1884. He died on 27 February 1907 in Grosseto.

References

Sources

Minucci, Giotto (1988). La città di Grosseto e i suoi vescovi (498-1988) [The city of Grosseto and its bishops (498-1988)]. Florence: Lucio Pugliese.

External links
 (for Chronology of Bishops) 
 (for Chronology of Bishops)  

19th-century Italian Roman Catholic bishops
20th-century Italian Roman Catholic bishops
Bishops appointed by Pope Leo XIII
Bishops of Grosseto
1847 births
1907 deaths